Hexaprotodon is an extinct genus of hippopotamid known from Africa and Asia. The name Hexaprotodon means "six front teeth" as some of the fossil forms have three pairs of incisors. 

The name Hexaprotodon was often applied to the pygmy hippopotamus before its reclassification into the genus Choeropsis. The genus sensu lato, including African taxa, has been suggested to be paraphyletic with respect to both species of living hippopotamus.  The uncontroversial, core Asian members of the genus most closely related to the type species H. sivalensis were widespread throughout the Late Neogene and Quaternary of South and Southeast Asia, with the oldest records coming from the Late Miocene Siwalik Hills. They were mostly extinct by the Late Middle Pleistocene in Southeast Asia but survived in Sumatra into the early Late Pleistocene. The last known populations survived on the Indian Subcontinent to the very end of the Pleistocene.  

Hexaprotodon survived in India until the terminal Pleistocene, with the latest dates being around 16,467–15,660 cal years Before Present from bones found in the Narmada River valley in central India. Fossil evidence from a late-surviving Indian Hexaprotodon indicates that it lived during a catastrophic drought caused by the latest Heinrich event, leading to an extremely weak Indian monsoon. It is thought that these drought conditions led to a heavy habitat fragmentation due to Hexaprotodon depending on aquatic habitats, prompting an extinction vortex. Humans may have also facilitated the extinction by hunting the hippopotamuses during this vulnerable state, although no evidence of hippopotamus butchery is known from the Indian subcontinent.

Species 
The genus Hexaprotodon contains the following species, all from Asia:

Hexaprotodon bruneti (Boisserie and White, 2004) 
Hexaprotodon crusafonti (Aguirre, 1963) 
Hexaprotodon hipponensis (Gaudry, 1867) 
Hexaprotodon imagunculus (Hopwood, 1926)
Hexaprotodon iravticus (Falconer and Cautley, 1847)  
Hexaprotodon karumensis (Coryndon, 1977) 
Hexaprotodon mingoz (Boisserie et al., 2003) 
Hexaprotodon namadicus (Falconer and Cautley, 1847 - possibly same as H. palaeindicus)
Hexaprotodon palaeindicus (Falconer and Cautley, 1847)
Hexaprotodon pantanellii (Joleaud, 1920) 
Hexaprotodon primaevus (Crusafont et al., 1964) 
Hexaprotodon protamphibius (Arambourg, 1944) 
Hexaprotodon siculus (Hooijer, 1946) 
Hexaprotodon sinhaleyus (Deraniyagala)
Hexaprotodon sivajavanicus (Hooijer, 1950)
Hexaprotodon sivalensis (Falconer and Cautley, 1836)
Hexaprotodon sp. - Myanmar hippopotamus (fossil)

References

Hippopotamuses
Prehistoric even-toed ungulate genera
Extinct mammals of Asia
Pleistocene even-toed ungulates
Fossil taxa described in 1836